Daria Snigur was the defending champion having won the previous edition in 2019. She participated in the women's singles qualifying, but lost to Beatriz Haddad Maia in the first round.

Ane Mintegi del Olmo won the title, defeating Nastasja Schunk in the final, 2–6, 6–4, 6–1.

Seeds

Draw

Finals

Top half

Section 1

Section 2

Bottom half

Section 3

Section 4

Qualifying

Seeds

Qualifiers

Draw

First qualifier

Second qualifier

Third qualifier

Fourth qualifier

Fifth qualifier

Sixth qualifier

Seventh qualifier

Eighth qualifier

References

External links

 Draw

Girls' Singles
Wimbledon Championship by year – Girls' singles